Devi Kanyakumari is a 1974 Indian Malayalam-language film, directed and produced by P. Subramaniam. The film stars Baby Vinodini, Kaviyoor Ponnamma, Thikkurissy Sukumaran Nair and Kedamangalam Sadanandan. It was released on 30 August 1974.

Plot

Cast 

Baby Vinodini as Devi Kanyakumari
Kaviyoor Ponnamma as Old Woman
Thikkurissy Sukumaran Nair as Kamsan
Kedamangalam Sadanandan
Prema as Padmavathi
Mohanan Kutty Krishnan as Omana's child's kidnapper
Shubha
Raghavan as Omana's Husband
Unnimary as Kumari
Adoor Bhavani as Uma
Adoor Pankajam as Kamalakshi
Anandavally
Aranmula Ponnamma as Thankamma Chechi
Gemini Ganesan as Vasudevan
Rajasree as Devaki
Kanta Rao as Mahavishnu
Kottarakkara Sreedharan Nair as Padmavathi's Husband
Manju Bhargavi as Kaali
N. Govindankutty as Arcot Nawab
P. K. Abraham as Banasuran
Rani Chandra as Omana
S. P. Pillai as Villuppaattu Singer Dasan Pillai
K. V. Shanthi
T. K. Balachandran as Naradan

Soundtrack 
The music was composed by G. Devarajan and the lyrics were written by Vayalar Ramavarma and Ashwathy Thirunaal, Swami Vivekananda. The soundtrack also includes traditional music.

References

External links 
 

1970s Malayalam-language films
1974 films
Films directed by P. Subramaniam